Takayuki (written: 孝之, 孝行, 孝幸, 隆之, 隆行, 隆幸, 高之, 高行, 高猷, 貴之, 貴幸, 貴由, 貴由輝, 崇之, 崇幸, 敬之, 卓行, 鷹幸, 恭之 or タカユキ in katakana) is a masculine Japanese given name. Notable people with the name include:

, Japanese racing driver
, Japanese footballer
, Japanese footballer
, Japanese footballer
, Japanese footballer
, Japanese footballer
, Japanese actor
, Japanese anime director
, Japanese professional wrestler
, Japanese long-distance runner
, Japanese sumo wrestler
, Japanese baseball player
, Japanese baseball player
, Japanese baseball player
, Japanese hurdler
, Japanese poet and writer
, Japanese sumo wrestler
, Japanese ice hockey player
, Japanese footballer
, Japanese voice actor
, Japanese karateka
, Japanese footballer
, Japanese footballer
, Japanese chief executive
, Japanese long-distance runner
, Japanese karateka
, Japanese sumo wrestler
, Japanese ice hockey player
, Japanese singer
, Japanese professional wrestler
, Japanese footballer
, Japanese footballer
, Japanese video game composer
, Japanese footballer
, Japanese footballer
, Japanese photographer
, Japanese engineer and inventor
, Japanese long jumper
, Japanese footballer
, Japanese ice hockey player
, Japanese actor
, Japanese samurai and politician
, Japanese voice actor
, Japanese footballer
, Japanese baseball player
, Japanese footballer
, Japanese voice actor
, Japanese footballer
, Japanese footballer
, Japanese Paralympic swimmer
, Japanese footballer
, Japanese baseball player
, Japanese baseball player
, Japanese footballer
, Japanese racewalker
, Japanese academic
, Japanese sumo wrestler
, Japanese baseball player
, Japanese sumo wrestler
, Japanese daimyō
, Japanese actor
, Japanese actor and singer
, Japanese voice actor
, Japanese manga artist
, Japanese footballer
, Japanese shogi player
, Japanese footballer
, Japanese footballer
, Japanese equestrian

See also
8294 Takayuki, a main-belt asteroid

Japanese masculine given names